Gunn Wållgren (born Gunnel Margaret Haraldsdotter Wållgren; ; 16 November 1913 – 4 June 1983) was a Swedish stage and film actress. She is known for her role as the grandmother in Ingmar Bergman's Fanny and Alexander.

Personal life
Gunn Wållgren was born in Gothenburg in November 1913. In her teenage years, she performed in some local children's theaters. Gunn Wållgren wanted to become an actress when she was a child. Her father, Harald Wållgren did not support this ambition. In an attempt to dissuade her, Gunn's father sent Gunn overseas on a trip to Switzerland, though this did not dissuade her. Carrying a tremendous shyness and insecurity, which came to personally restrict her all her life, in 1934, age 21, she secretly applied for the Royal Dramatic Theatre's acting school in Stockholm and was admitted first try.

Gunn Wållgren was married firstly to Hampe Faustman (born Erik Stellan Chatham), an actor and film director, from 1941 until their divorce in 1949. She married secondly to Per-Axel Branner, a stage director, from 1954 until his death in 1975. She had two daughters from her marriage with Faustman: Susanne and Elaine.

Career

Theater 
Gunn Wållgren's was awarded her first major role in 1936, at the Royal Dramatic Theatre portraying Mildred in Eugene O'Neill's Ah, Wilderness!, which went on to become a very successful and long-running production. Winning the critics' and the audience's heart in her part she received an immediate contract with the Royal Dramatic Theatre after her graduation from drama school in 1937. Despite working at different theatres throughout her life, Gunn always returned to the national stage. Stage performances by Wållgren include her portrayal of Sorel Bliss in Noël Coward's Hay Fever in 1937, Celia in Shakespeare's As You Like It 1938 (directed by Alf Sjöberg), the strong portrayal of Curley's wife in the original Swedish staging of John Steinbeck's Of Mice and Men in 1940, Iphigenia in Goethe's Iphigenia in Tauris 1941, Ophelia in the classic 1942 staging of Hamlet (opposite Lars Hanson in the title role), Mary Grey/Joan of Arc in Joan of Lorraine by Maxwell Anderson in 1948, Catherine Sloper in The Heiress by Ruth and Augustus Goetz in the 1950/51 season, Indra's daughter in the Olof Molander-staging of Strindberg's A Dream Play 1955, Nina in Chekhov's The Seagull 1955, Masha in Chekhov's Three Sisters 1958, Isabella in Shakespeare's Measure for Measure 1958, Nora in Ibsen's A Doll's House 1962, Gerda in Strindberg's Storm 1964, Mrs. Alving in Ibsen's Ghosts 196?, the grand portrayal of Madame Liubov Andreievna Ranevskaya in The Cherry Orchard by Chekhov in 1967, Martha Brewster in Arsenic and Old Lace in 1970, the title role of Agnes in Kent Andersson's 1972 play, Lena in Fugard's Boesman and Lena 1977; and the role of Ethel Thayer in Sista sommaren (play based on the Oscar-winning film On Golden Pond, starring Katharine Hepburn in the same part) in 1981.

Film 
Wållgren's film debut was in Sonja in 1943, but her breakthrough came with Kvinnor i fångenskap the same year, where Wållgren portrayed a young prisoner on the run. She had roles in films such as Flickan och djävulen (The Girl And The Devil) (opposite Stig Järrel) 1944, Var sin väg (Each To His Own Way) 1946, Medan porten var stängd (While The Door Was Locked) 1946 (written & directed by Hasse Ekman), Kvinna utan ansikte (Woman Without A Face) 1947 (with an early script by Ingmar Bergman), Glasberget (Mountain Of Glass) 1953 (directed by Hasse Ekman) and Klänningen (The Dress) 1964 (directed by Olof Molander with a script by Vilgot Sjöman), among others.

Her supporting part in Gunnel Lindblom's debating drama Sally och friheten (1981) (Sally and Freedom), about a woman dealing with the painful memories and reality of an abortion, earned her the Guldbagge Award (the Golden Beetle), for Best Actress.

Wållgren received critical acclaim for her portrayal of the grandmother in Ingmar Bergman's film Fanny och Alexander (1982), which was the last role of her life.

Death 
Shortly after filming Fanny and Alexander, Wållgren was diagnosed with terminal cancer. Her condition deteriorated quickly and she died on 4 June 1983.

Filmography

 Imprisoned Women (1943) as Viola
 The Sixth Shot (1943) as Lulu
 Sonja (1943) as Sonja's Room-mate
 Ordet (1943) as Kristina
 The Girl and the Devil (1944) as Karin
 The Emperor of Portugallia (1944) as Klara Fina Gulleborg
 Crime and Punishment (1945) as Sonja
 The Journey Away (1945) as Ellen Andersson
 Desire (1946) as Ingrid
 While the Door Was Locked (1946) as Marianne Sahlen
 Harald the Stalwart (1946) as Peasant woman 
 Woman Without A Face (1947) as Rut Köhler
 Each to His Own Way (1948) as Birgit Sundell
 The Nuthouse (1951) as Maggan 
 The Glass Mountain (1953) as Otti Moreus
 The Dress (1964) as Helen Fürst
 Asmodeus (1966, TV film) as Madame de Berthas
 Kvinnas man (1966, TV film) as Lotta Friman
 Tartuffe (1966, TV Movie) as Elmire
 Fadren (aka Strindberg's The Father) (1967, TV film) as Laura
 Gengångare (aka Ibsen's Ghosts) (1967, TV Movie) as Candida
 Miss and Mrs Sweden (1969) as Rose Persson-Silvergrå
 Frida och hennes vän (1970, TV Mini-Series) as Fridas mor
 Söderkåkar (1970, TV Mini-Series) ) as Hanna Johnsson
 The Man Who Quit Smoking (1972) as Aunt Gunhild
 Kvartetten som sprängdes (1973, TV series) as Mrs. Åvik
 Rulle på Rulseröd (1974, TV Series) as Farmor
 Agnes (1974, TV film) as Agnes
 Förvandlingen (1976) as Gregor's Mother
 Leva livet (1976, TV film) as Mrs. Blom
 The Brothers Lionheart (1977) as Sofia
 Strandvaskeren (1978, TV Series) as Grandmother
 Svartskallen (1981, TV film) as Inez Bergman
 Sally and Freedom (1981) as Sally's Mother
 Fanny and Alexander (1982) as Helena Ekdahl - Ekdahlska huse

Awards
The Eugene O'Neill Award (1959)
The Swedish Theatre Critics' Award (1962)
The Guldbagge Award for Best Actress (1981)

See also
The Gunn Wållgren Award

References

Further reading

External links

Complete list of Gunn Wållgren's stage work at the Royal Dramatic Theatre 

1913 births
1983 deaths
Deaths from cancer in Sweden
Eugene O'Neill Award winners
Litteris et Artibus recipients
Best Actress Guldbagge Award winners
20th-century Swedish actresses